Società Sportiva Arezzo (formerly Associazione Sportiva Dilettantistica Atletico Arezzo and Associazione Calcio Arezzo) is an Italian association football club based in Arezzo, Tuscany. The club was formed in 1923, refounded in 1993 after going bankrupt and refounded in 2010 after being unable to enroll in the tournament. The club currently plays in Serie D, the fourth tier of Italian football.

History

The club was founded on 9 September 1923, by a group of friends, and football fans, as Juventus Football Club Arezzo (in honour of Juventus F.C.). In 1930, following a merge with several other minor Arezzo teams, the club became Unione Sportiva Arezzo, which was admitted in 1935 to new-born Serie C division. The team was relegated from Serie C in 1953, following several financial troubles, returning to Serie C division five years later. In 1961, Arezzo started to play its games in the Stadio Comunale, its current venue. In 1966, Arezzo promoted to Serie B for the first time; in order to celebrate the triumph, Arezzo played a friendly match with Brazilian team Vasco da Gama, winning it 2–1. However, the next year Arezzo was not able to remain in the division, and returned to Serie C the following year. But in 1969 Arezzo again won Serie C, and returned to play in Serie B, where it played until 1975. In 1971, Arezzo signed striker Francesco Graziani, who quickly became a fan favourite and a key player for the team.

The third promotion to Serie B came in 1982, under coach Antonio Valentin Angelillo, with Tullio Gritti as striker. The previous year, Arezzo had won its first (and only) Italy's Serie C Cup, defeating Ternana in the finals. In 1984, Arezzo barely missed promotion to Serie A, ending just five points back from the last promotion place. In 1988, despite a team accordingly built to promote to Serie A, Arezzo relegated to Serie C1. Arezzo disbanded in 1993, following financial troubles, being excluded by Serie C1 seven football days before the end of the season. Following the cancellation, a pool of shareholders led by former Arezzo star Ciccio Graziani founded Associazione Calcio Arezzo, admitted to Serie D. In 1996 an unknown coach with a few lower division experiences, Serse Cosmi, was appointed as new manager. Despite his complete lack of experience in the division, Cosmi immediately won hands down Serie D, leading Arezzo back to professional football. In 1998, again with Cosmi, Arezzo qualified to and won the Serie C2 promotion playoffs, gaining promotion to Serie C1. In 1999/2000, despite the contributions of Fabio Bazzani, Arezzo lost promotion playoffs; the following year, after Cosmi left Arezzo for Serie A side Perugia, Antonio Cabrini was appointed as new coach, and Mario Frick replaced Bazzani as forward. The team returned to Serie B in 2004, with Mario Somma as coach; the next season, which saw Pasquale Marino replacing Somma, who signed for Empoli, Arezzo barely maintained a Serie B place.

At the end of the 2009–10 Lega Pro Prima Divisione season the club, due to financial problems, were unable to enroll to the next season tournament. A new club with the Associazione Sportiva Dilettantistica Atletico Arezzo denomination was entered in Serie D.

In November 2010 the club was acquired by a consortium of Rome-based entrepreneurs (including popular actor Luca Zingaretti) for a sum of €400,000; the new owners immediately made a number of changes, appointing former Cagliari player Maurizio Coppola as head coach and former Serie A star Abel Balbo as assistant coach and technical area coordinator.

On 1 July 2012 the club was renamed Unione Sportiva Arezzo with Balbo as new head coach, replaced since 30 October 2012 by Michele Bacis.

On 9 January 2013 Mauro Ferretti, an enreprenuer from Rome, bought the club. A few weeks later, on 28 January, Federico Nofri replaced Bacis as coach.

For the 2013–14 season, Davide Mezzanotti was appointed as new coach. After the club ended in third place, Ezio Capuano was named new head coach; later in September 2014, Arezzo was readmitted to Lega Pro to fill a vacancy. Under Capuano's tenure (which lasted until April 2016), the club safely escaped relegation on both seasons. For the 2016–17 season, the club came with a new head coach, Stefano Sottili, and a number of major signings such as former Serie A player Davide Moscardelli.

League and cup history

Scoring history
Highest scoring and best win:
2004–05 season: 5–3, defeated Verona

Players

Current squad

Notable players

Two legends of the Arezzo midfield during the 2005–2006 season were Simone Confalone and Daniele Di Donato ("Dido"), who ruled the pitch with their tough, but sensual play. Fans would shower the players with women's undergarments and sharp Romano cheese in honor of the players' personal appetites and heritage. Raw asparagus was occasionally added into the mix but was considered very offensive by other fans - riots ensued.

Notable managers
  Antonio Conte

 Maurizio Sarri

Honours
Coppa Italia Serie C
 Winners: 1980–81
Supercoppa di Serie C
Winners: 2004

References

External links
Official website

 
Football clubs in Italy
Football clubs in Tuscany
Association football clubs established in 1923
Serie B clubs
Serie C clubs
1923 establishments in Italy
Coppa Italia Serie C winning clubs